Snow Wonder is a 2005 American made-for-television drama film adapted from a Connie Willis short story. The film starred Michelle Krusiec, Camryn Manheim, Mary Tyler Moore, Jason Priestley, Josh Randall, and Eric Szmanda, and was produced by The Wolper Organization. It originally aired November 20, 2005 on CBS.

Plot 
A freak snowstorm covers the entire world on Christmas Eve, changing the lives of five characters.

Cast 
Julie Ann Emery as Stacey
Jennifer Esposito as Pilar
Camryn Manheim as Bev
Poppy Montgomery as Paula
Jason Priestley as Warren
Josh Randall as Billy
David Sutcliffe as Jim
Eric Szmanda as Luke
Mary Tyler Moore as Aunt Lula
Michelle Krusiec as Joey
Vince Vieluf as Mario
Hunter Clary as Miguel

Critical reception 
Writing for Variety, critic Brian Lowry called the film "schmaltz" and "a sprawling mishmash of holiday stories", but said that the film "flits between them amiably enough".

See also
 List of Christmas films

External links

References 

2005 films
American Christmas films
CBS network films
Films based on short fiction
Christmas television films